The 2009 Florida Atlantic University Owls football team represented Florida Atlantic University in the 2009 NCAA Division I FBS football season. The team was coached by Howard Schnellenberger and played their home games at Lockhart Stadium in Fort Lauderdale, Florida. The Owls were in their fourth season of competition in the Sun Belt Conference. The Owls finished the season 5–7 and 5–3 in Sun Belt play.

Preseason
The Florida Atlantic Owls entered the 2009 NCAA Division I FBS football season hoping to rebound on what was considered a disappointing 2008 campaign.  The 2008 team ended the season 7–6 (4–3 SBC), despite returning an overwhelming majority of starters from the 2007 conference champion team.  Quarterback Rusty Smith entered his senior season.  The 2009 team looked to rebuild on defense, losing defensive star, Frantz Joseph, and a number of other key starters.

The Owls looked to shoot for their third-consecutive bowl appearance, as the 2008 squad defeated the Central Michigan Chippewas in the 2008 Motor City Bowl.

The Owls also had to deal with a new offensive system, as Gary Nord, offensive coordinator for Florida Atlantic since 2004, took the same job at Purdue.

Preseason honors

Preseason Sun Belt Players of the Year
 Sun Belt Conference Co-Player of the Year, Offense: Rusty Smith (QB, Sr.)

Preseason All-Sun Belt honors
 Rusty Smith (QB, Sr.)
 Jamari Grant (TE, Sr.)

Schedule

Awards and honors

Mid-season awards and honors
 Week 15 Sun Belt Conference Player of the Week, Offense: Alfred Morris (RB, So.)
 2009 Shula Bowl Most Valuable Player: Alfred Morris (RB, So.)

Post-season awards and honors

All-Sun Belt honors
 First Team All-Sun Belt Conference:
 Jason Harmon (TE, Sr.)
 Alfred Morris (RB, So.)
 Second Team All-Sun Belt Conference:
 David Matlock (OL, Sr.)
 Honorable Mention All-Sun Belt Conference:
 Marcus Bartels (DB, So.)
 Kevin Cyrille (DL, So.)

Records broken in 2009
The 2009 football season saw numerous school records broken.

References

Florida Atlantic
Florida Atlantic Owls football seasons
Florida Atlantic Owls football